is an old province of Japan in the area of Akita Prefecture and some parts of Yamagata Prefecture (specifically Akumi District). It was sometimes called , with Uzen Province.

Historical districts
 Yamagata Prefecture
 Akumi District (飽海郡)
 Akita Prefecture
 Akita District (秋田郡)
 Kitaakita District (北秋田郡)
 Minamiakita District (南秋田郡)
 Hiraka District (平鹿郡) - dissolved
 Kawabe District (河辺郡) - dissolved
 Ogachi District (雄勝郡)
 Semboku District (仙北郡)
 Yamamoto District (山本郡)
 Yuri District (由利郡) - dissolved

Notes

References
 Nussbaum, Louis-Frédéric and Käthe Roth. (2005).  Japan encyclopedia. Cambridge: Harvard University Press. ;  OCLC 58053128

Other websites

  Murdoch's map of provinces, 1903

Former provinces of Japan